Azygonyx was a small tillodont mammal, likely the size of a cat to raccoon, that lived in North America during the Paleocene and Eocene in the early part of the Cenozoic Era. The only fossils that have been recovered are from the Willwood and Fort Union Formations in the Bighorn Basin of Wyoming, United States, and date to the Clarkforkian to Wasatchian, about 56 to 50 million years ago. Fifty-six collections that have been recovered thus far include the remains of Azygonyx. Azygonyx survived the Paleocene Eocene Thermal Maximum along with other mammals like Phenacodus and Ectocion, both of which were ground-dwelling mammals. Azygonyx probably was a generalist terrestrial mammal that may have roamed around the ground, but was also capable of climbing trees.

Etymology 
The genus name comes from the "a-" meaning absent, "zygos-" meaning joining, and "onyx" meaning claw referencing the unjoined claw-like incisors.

Taxonomy 
Azygonyx is placed in the suborder Tillodontia, an extinct group of mammals characterized by rodent-like incisors, clawed feet, and an elongated rostrum and mandibular symphysis. Azygonyx belongs to the family Esthonychidae, but differs from other esthonyids by having an unfused mandibular symphysis.

Five species of Azygonyx are currently known and includes the type species Azygonyx gunnelli (Gingerich and Gunnell, 1979) and the additional species Azygonyx ancylion (Gingerich and Gunnell, 1979), Azygonyx grangeri (Simpson, 1937), Azygonyx latidens (Simpson, 1937), and Azygonyx xenicus (Gingerich and Gunnell, 1979). The genus has a relatively problematic taxonomic history, as the type species Azygonyx gunelli and other species of the genus are alternatively named Esthonyx by Lucas and Schoch (1998).

The type species comes from Park County in northwestern Wyoming, and is composed of teeth, cranial, and postcranial bones. The bone fragments were broken and scattered suggesting a taphonomic pathway that includes trampling before burial. The holotype specimen (UM 83874) from Wyoming, USA consists of upper and lower dentition with dentary bone. Post cranial remains include the scapula, ulna, radius, ankle bones, and others.

Description 
No complete skeleton of Azygonyx has been recovered, making the exact appearance and body size of the animal relatively difficult to determine.

The upper dentition of Azygonyx includes three incisors (I1–I3), one canine (C1), premolars (P2–P4), and molars (M1–M3), and the lower dentition includes two incisors (I1–I2), one canine (C1), premolars (P2–P4), and molars (M1–M3). A lower first incisor has not actually been recovered, but is believed to be present due to the available space in the lower jaw. A lower third incisor was likely extremely reduced or absent. The incisors of Azygonyx are tall and nearly vertical. The anterior teeth, the incisors and canines, were crowded. The second incisor has a massive oval crown. Lower premolars have smooth enamel set in a relatively deep jaw and the third premolar crown is large and bulbous.

Paleoecology 
Tillodonts are considered to be generalists and some may have been rhizophagous. The large and laterally compressed claws and shallow trochlea of the astragalus suggests that the mode of life of Azygonyx was scansorial, or adapted for climbing. In contrast, bones of the foot suggest a somewhat cursorial or fossorial lifestyle. Worn enamel on the teeth additionally suggest Azygonyx stripped vegetation. Azygonyx likely spent a lot of time in trees, but also occasionally searched for food on the ground or dug for roots.

References

Further reading 

 W. C. Clyde. 1997. Stratigraphy and mammalian paleontology of the McCullough Peaks, northern Bighorn Basin, Wyoming: Implications for biochronology, basin development, and community reorganization across the Paleocene-Eocene boundary. PhD Thesis, University of Michigan
 D. W. Krause. 1982. Multituberculates from the Wasatchian Land-Mammal Age, Early Eocene, of Western North America. Journal of Paleontology 56(2):271-294
 K. D. Rose. 1981. The Clarkforkian Land-Mammal Age and Mammalian Faunal Composition Across the Paleocene-Eocene Boundary. University of Michigan Papers on Paleontology 26:1-197
 M. C. McKenna. 1980. Late Cretaceous and Early Tertiary vertebrate paleontological reconnaissance, Togwotee Pass area, northwestern Wyoming. Aspects of Vertebrate History: Essays in Honor of Edwin Harris Colbert, L. L. Jacobs (ed.), Museum of Northern Arizona Press 323-343
 P. D. Gingerich and G. F. Gunnell. 1979. Systematics and Evolution of the Genus Esthonyx (Mammalia, Tillodontia) in the Early Eocene of North America. Contributions from the Museum of Paleontology, University of Michigan 25(7):125-153

Tillodontia
Eocene mammals of North America
Paleocene mammals of North America
Clarkforkian
Wasatchian
Thanetian life
Ypresian life
Paleontology in Wyoming
Fossil taxa described in 1989
Prehistoric mammal genera